During the 1896–97 season Hibernian, a football club based in Edinburgh, finished second out of 10 clubs in the Scottish First Division.

Scottish First Division

Final League table

Scottish Cup

See also
List of Hibernian F.C. seasons

References

External links
Hibernian 1896/1897 results and fixtures, Soccerbase

Hibernian F.C. seasons
Hibernian